Kelly House may refer to:
Kelly House, Devon, a manor house and estate in Devon, England
C.D. Kelly House, in Judsonia, Arkansas
John and Kate Kelly House, in Honolulu, Hawaii, a National Register of Historic Places listing in Oahu
Edward M. Kelly House, in Wichita, Kansas, a National Register of Historic Places listing in Sedgwick County, Kansas
George H. Kelly House, in Omaha, Nebraska
Eugene V. Kelly Carriage House, at Seton Hall University, South Orange, New Jersey
Daniel T. Kelly House, in Santa Fe, New Mexico, a National Register of Historic Places listing in Santa Fe County, New Mexico
Col. William Kelly House, in Buffalo, New York
Kelly House (Syracuse, New York)
Alexander Kelly House, in Carthage, North Carolina
J. Nelson Kelly House, in Grand Forks, North Dakota
Joseph D. and Margaret Kelly House, in The Dalles, Oregon
Amos Kelly House, in Cambridge Springs, Pennsylvania
Albert H. Kelly House, in Salt Lake City, Utah
John B. Kelly House, in Salt Lake City, Utah
T.R. Kelly House, in Springville, Utah

See also
Glaser-Kelly House, in Sheridan, Arkansas
Kelley House (disambiguation)
Kelly Family Home, in Dayton, Ohio
Ormsby-Kelly House, in Emmetsburg, Iowa
Phillips-Turner-Kelly House, in Monticello, Georgia, a National Register of Historic Places listing in Jasper County, Georgia